A Sign of Sublime is the debut solo album of former Cradle of Filth vocalist Sarah Jezebel Deva. It is the only album to be released by Deva on Rising Records, as a new three-record deal was signed with Listenable Records for the follow-up album.

Promotion
A music video for the title track was released before the album's release. Deva was interviewed in the UK magazine Metal Hammer, announcing her work as a solo artist.

Track listing

References

2010 debut albums
Sarah Jezebel Deva albums